Marlo Morgan (born September 29, 1937) is an American author, best known for the bestselling book Mutant Message Down Under. She has also written Message from Forever (1998), another novel based on Australian Aboriginal themes. In 1996, she was confronted about the veracity of her book by Aboriginal protesters and admitted the stories from her books were fake.

Mutant Message Down Under
Morgan self-published a book in 1990 titled Mutant Message Down Under, which purported to chronicle the journey of a middle-aged, white, American woman with a group of 62 desert Aborigines, the "Real People", across the continent of Australia. The author states the book was written after the fact inspired by actual experience.

Mutant Message Down Under quickly attained word of mouth popularity with the New Age movement in the United States, was picked up for bookstore distribution by Bookpeople, then consequently picked up by giant publishing firm HarperCollins, and marketed as fiction by them. Nearly a million copies of the HarperCollins publication have been sold around the world. Morgan completed many lecture tours promoting the book in the United States and Europe. In her lectures Morgan speaks of her actual experience with the "Real People" and states she is an Aborigine.

According to the 90-page report published by the Perth-based Dumbartung Aboriginal Corporation, a survey of Aboriginal groups in Central and Western Australia failed to uncover any indication whatsoever of Morgan's presence in the area or of the existence of the "Real People" tribe. They claim that Aboriginal groups believe Morgan's desert journey to be fabricated and that her book and teaching lack credibility. The Dumbartung Aboriginal Corporation stated that it was deeply offensive to Aboriginal people for a white person to be misrepresenting Aboriginal culture for self-promotion and profit. Aboriginal people expressed anger that Morgan's false message is being accepted as fact by a naive American and European market and were extremely concerned about the resulting long-term implications for their culture.

In 1996 a group of Aboriginal elders, seriously disturbed by the book's implications, received a grant to travel to the States and confront Morgan about her book and to try to prevent a Hollywoodisation of it. She admitted publicly that she had faked it but this received little publicity in the USA. The Aboriginal people are angry that this book continues to be promoted and sold widely because it gives a false picture of their traditional culture and of their current political and social status. This is regarded as damaging to their struggle for survival.

References

External links 
  Oh, the stories we tell – Radio National program which includes detail and interviews on the "Mutant Message" and other literary hoaxes, the Marlo Morgan material commences 25 minutes into the 55 minute recording.
  Dumbartung Aboriginal Corporation – Homepage of the website of the Dumbartung Aboriginal Corporation, the corporation strives to protect the artistic integrity and cultural heritage of Australian Aboriginal people from non-Aboriginal exploitation, misappropriation and misinformation.
  Timeline 1990–2008 – Marlo Morgan and Mutant Message Down Under, chronological summary.

1937 births
Living people
20th-century American novelists
American women novelists
Literary forgeries
Hoaxes in Australia
20th-century American women writers
21st-century American women writers